The Belladrum Tartan Heart Festival is a music and arts festival, held on the Belladrum Estate in Kiltarlity near Inverness, in Scotland.  It is normally held at the start of August. Founded in 2004, the festival has rapidly grown in popularity. The festival has sold out in advance every year since 2008. The capacity of the 2019 festival was 20,000.

Background information
The festival is well known for its wide-ranging musical scope, as well as its family friendly atmosphere, with a large dedicated family camp-site, as well as free entry for children under the age of 12.   
Previous acts that have played at the festival include Madness, Tom Jones, Two Door Cinema Club, Kaiser Chiefs, Ed Sheeran, Ben Howard, James, Manic Street Preachers, Deacon Blue, Texas Embrace, The Automatic, The Proclaimers, The Wombats, Travis,  and many more.

Stages include, The Garden Stage (Main Stage set in Italian Gardens), The Hot House (Rock Indie, Alternative, Singer-songwriter), The Grassroots (folk, roots, acoustic), Venus Flytrap (comedy, wrestling, cabaret), The Seedlings (emerging and buzz new acts), Mother's Ruin (Dance and Electronic), The Verb Garden (talks, debates, films), The Burke and Hare (cabaret, performance, dj's), The Bella Bar stage, Free Range Folk Stage (singer-songwriters, traditional, acoustic based bands), Jazz Bar (new for 2016) and an array of busking stages.

Other areas of the festival include a dedicated children's area, with puppet workshops, arts and crafts, circus skills, dance and music classes and much more. The Walled Garden hosts a variety of alternative therapies, the Burke & Hare and Free Rage Folk stages, and re-enactment groups.

Over the years the festival has also hosted Ice-rinks, roller discos, Danny Maccaskills Drop & Roll, and a zip line.

Fringe 
In previous years as well as the festival itself there was also a Festival fringe which centered around the 2 weeks surrounding the festival.
This finished in the early hours of Hootananny's on the Thursday prior to the festival.
The fringe's gigs had no entry-fee in some bars/pubs however others may charge, the fringe showcased a variety of Acts and Music Genres.
The Fringe set the mood in the run up to Belladrum Tartan Heart Festival on 8 and 9 August 2008, offering a musical trail around the Highlands for the intrepid music lover.

2004 
The festival began in 2004 with 2,000 people attending for one day in Belladrum's Italian Gardens, the terraced arena that still forms the main stage. Since then, the capacity has grown 18,500 people over two and a half days (3 - 5 August 2017), with an additional headliner being added to the ceilidh warm up on the Thursday night in 2015.

Garden Stage

2005 
In 2005 the festival was on Friday 12 and Saturday 13 August. This year it had five stages, ranging in size from the Grassroots Tent, which has a capacity of approximately 250 and is dedicated to small acoustic and folk acts, through to the Garden Stage, which is a natural amphitheatre that can hold several thousand people

In 2005, new features include the Seedlings Stage for new or unsigned artists and the Venus Flytrap Palais, a stage totally dedicated to the wonderful and sometimes, frankly, weird in music, theatre, cabaret and performance art.

Garden Stage

Hothouse Stage

The Black Isle brewery Grassroots Stage

2006

Garden Stage

Hothouse Stage

The Black Isle brewery Grassroots Stage

Hail Seedlings Stage

Venus Flytrap Palais

2007

Garden Stage

Hothouse Stage

The Black Isle brewery Grassroots Stage

Hail Seedlings Stage

Venus Flytrap Palais

2008 
2008 saw the Tartan Heart Festival win the award for the best Grass Roots Festival (2008)

Garden Stage

Hothouse Stage

The Black Isle brewery Grassroots Stage

Hail Seedlings Stage

Venus Flytrap Palais

cid

2009 
The 2009 festival took place on 7 and 8 August, and the headline acts were the Editors and Ocean Colour Scene

Garden Stage

Hothouse Stage

The Black Isle brewery Grassroots Stage

Hail Seedlings Stage

Potting Shed Stage

Mother's Ruin DJ Stage

2010 
Feeder
Amy Macdonald
The Wailers
Badly Drawn Boy
The Divine Comedy
The Levellers
King Creosote
Twin Atlantic
Candy Staton
Dick Gaughan
The Vatersay Boys

2011 
Texas
Deacon Blue
Ed Sheeran
Ben Howard
King Charles
Frank Turner
Skerryvore
Teddy Thompson
Vintage Trouble
Roddy Hart & The Lonesome Fire
The David Latto Band (Potting Shed Stage)

2012

Garden Stage

Hothouse Stage

2013 
Garden Stage (Main Stage) saw James headline along with Twin Atlantic, Pigeon Detectives, Alabama 3, Seasick Steve and many more.

Mothers Ruin Stage (DJ Stage)

2014 

 Tom Jones
 Reef
 Frightened Rabbit
 Billy Bragg
 Glenn Tilbrook
 The Temperance Movement
 Grandmaster Flash
 Adrian Edmondson & The Bad Shepherds
 The Vatersay Boys

2015

Garden Stage (Main Stage)

Hothouse Stage

Grassroots Stage

2016

Garden Stage (Main Stage)

Hothouse Stage

2017 

 The Pretenders
 Franz Ferdinand
 Sister Sledge
 K T Tunstall
 First Aid Kit
 Colonel Mustard & The Dijon 5

2018 

 Paloma Faith
 The Fun Lovin' Criminals
 The Charlatans
 Amy Macdonald
 Professor Green
 Ward Thomas
 Colonel Mustard & The Dijon 5
Gerry Cinamon
Primal Scream

2019

Garden Stage (Main Stage)

Hot House Stage

2022
The Belladrum Tartan Heart Festival returned to Scotland on 28 July 2022 with the festival featuring performances from The Magic Numbers, Tide Lines, Daytime TV, Emeli Sandé, Admiral Fallow,  Nile Rodgers & Chic, Dreadzone, The Fratellis, Siobhan Miller, Vistas, Peat & Diesel (replacing Sam Ryder at short notice), Shed Seven, Passenger and a DJ set from Gok Wan. Highlights from the festival were broadcast on BBC Scotland and BBC Alba, with Fiona MacKenzie and Niall Iain MacDonald presenting. Full sets from a number of acts were also available on the BBC iPlayer.

References

External links

Official website
Pictures from the Festival
Pass application for Festival Fringe
Official 2004 website
Official 2005 website
Official 2006 website
Official 2007 website
Official 2008 website

Culture in Inverness
Rock festivals in Scotland
Indie rock festivals
Folk festivals in Scotland
Busking venues
2004 establishments in Scotland
Annual events in Scotland
Music festivals established in 2004
Tourist attractions in Scotland
Autumn events in Scotland